Nice Work If You Can Get It may refer to:

 "Nice Work If You Can Get It" (song), a 1937 popular standard by George and Ira Gershwin
 Nice Work If You Can Get It (album), a 1983 album by Ella Fitzgerald
 Nice Work If You Can Get It (musical), a 2012 Broadway musical with a score by George and Ira Gershwin